Elections to the Odisha Legislative Assembly were held in February 1990 to elect members of the 147 constituencies in Odisha, India. The Janata Party won a majority of seats and Biju Patnaik was appointed as the Chief Minister of Odisha. The number of constituencies was set as 147 by the recommendation of the Delimitation Commission of India.

Result

Elected members

See also
List of constituencies of the Odisha Legislative Assembly
1990 elections in India

References

Odisha
State Assembly elections in Odisha
1990s in Orissa